Two-time defending champion Novak Djokovic defeated Tomáš Berdych in the final, 6–0, 6–2 to win the men's singles tennis title at the 2014 China Open.

Seeds

 Novak Djokovic (champion)
 Rafael Nadal (quarterfinals)
 Tomáš Berdych (final)
 Marin Čilić (quarterfinals)

 Grigor Dimitrov (quarterfinals)
 Andy Murray (semifinals)
 Ernests Gulbis (second round, retired because of shoulder injury)
 John Isner (quarterfinals)

Draw

Finals

Section top half

Section bottom half

Qualifying

Seeds

 Teymuraz Gabashvili (qualified)
 Martin Kližan (qualified)
 Simone Bolelli (qualifying competition)
 Malek Jaziri (qualifying competition)
 Mikhail Kukushkin (qualified)
 Matthew Ebden (first round)
 Filip Krajinović (first round)
 Máximo González (first round)

Qualifiers

Qualifying draw

First qualifier

Second qualifier

Third qualifier

Fourth qualifier

References
 Main Draw
 Qualifying Draw

China Open - Men's Singles